The Duchies of Lancaster and Cornwall (Accounts) Act 1838 (1 & 2 Vict c 101) is an Act of the Parliament of the United Kingdom.

It requires the Duchy of Cornwall and the Duchy of Lancaster to present their annual accounts to Parliament.

Title
In the title, the words from "revive" to "and to" were repealed by section 1(1) of, and Part IV of Schedule 1 to, the Statute Law (Repeals) Act 1978.

Preamble 
The preamble was repealed by section 1(1) of, and Part IV of Schedule 1 to, the Statute Law (Repeals) Act 1978.

Section 1
This section was repealed by section 1(1) of, and Part IV of Schedule 1 to, the Statute Law (Repeals) Act 1978.

Section 2
The section requires accounts to be annually submitted to the Lords Commissioners of the Treasury and presented to both Houses of Parliament.

This section was amended by section 9(1) of the Duchy of Cornwall Management Act 1982 to adjust the deadline for the presentation of the accounts from the Duchy of Cornwall from being one calendar month after Parliament first meets each year to a fixed annual date of 30 June.

References

External links

The Duchies of Lancaster and Cornwall (Accounts) Act 1838, as amended, from Legislation.gov.uk.
The Duchies of Lancaster and Cornwall (Accounts) Act 1838, as originally enacted, from Legislation.gov.uk.

United Kingdom Acts of Parliament 1838
Duchy of Cornwall
Duchy of Lancaster
19th century in Cornwall